The St. Ann's Cathedral is a Roman Catholic cathedral in Canada. The seat of the Diocese of Sainte-Anne-de-la-Pocatière, it is located in La Pocatière, in the Regional County Municipality of Kamouraska and the region of Bas-Saint-Laurent, in Quebec, eastern Canada. It is dedicated to St. Ann, whose feast is celebrated on July 26; St. Ann is also the patron saint of Quebec.

The Cathedral of St. Ann is the eighth temple of the paroisse Sainte-Anne, originally built in 1678, and then other times in 1715, 1735, 1767, 1800, 1845, 1920 and 1950. The crypt of the veneration of St. Ann arrived to the then New France, along with the first French settlers. In Quebec, about twenty parishes are under the patronage of St. Ann; La Pocatière is one of the oldest.

See also
Catholic Church in Canada
Church of St. Ann

References

Roman Catholic cathedrals in Quebec
La Pocatière
Roman Catholic churches completed in 1950
20th-century Roman Catholic church buildings in Canada